Kyneria is a monotypic moth genus of the family Erebidae. Its only species, Kyneria utuadae, is known from Puerto Rico. Both the genus and the species were first described by Schaus in 1940.

References

Herminiinae
Monotypic moth genera